Ya'akov "Yankele" Hodorov (Hebrew: יעקב חודורוב) (16 June 1927 – 31 December 2006) was an Israeli football goalkeeper in the 1940s, 1950s, and 1960s. He is one Israel's best goalkeepers of all time and the leading goalkeeper of his generation.

Football career
Hodorov started his football career at Maccabi Rishon LeZion at the age of 15. After a few years, he moved to local rival Hapoel Rishon LeZion, where he first got national recognition as the team reached the cup final in 1946. Shortly afterward he moved to Hapoel Tel Aviv, the club where he stayed for most of his career. At Hapoel Tel Aviv he won the Israeli league championship in 1957 and the Israeli state cup in 1960. Later he joined Hapoel Ramat Gan and won another league title in 1964, and afterward played at Shimshon Tel Aviv and ended his career with Hapoel Holon, where he also had a short spell as coach.

He was 5'10 (1.78) feet tall and nicknamed "the Bird".

Hodorov made his debut for the national team in a friendly match against Cyprus in 1949, and for the next decade played in almost all international matches. He soon became the hero of the team that struggled against European opponents. He reached his peak in the latter half of the 1950s.

The most memorable match of his career was in 1958 FIFA World Cup qualification against Wales at Cardiff, in which he suffered a broken nose in a collision with Welsh striker John Charles, but continued to play and made dozens of acrobatic saves.

Other notable matches were against USSR at Ramat Gan Stadium in 1956 Olympic qualification, where he played with a broken finger, and Israel's sensational win over Yugoslavia at Belgrade in 1960 Olympic qualification.

Hodorov received lucrative offers from several European professional clubs, including Arsenal FC, but he turned them down and chose to play his entire career in the then-amateur Israeli league.

Awards and recognition

In 2006, Hodorov was awarded the Israel Prize for his contribution to sports, one of few sportspeople who received this honour. Several days before he was due to receive the prize he suffered a stroke and was unable to attend the ceremony. This stroke eventually led to his death several months later on New Year's Eve 2006 at the age of 79.

In popular culture 
He is the last footballer (before repetition in the fade-out) to be mentioned in Arik Einstein's song Ve'ele Shemot (these are the names) that repeats several times the text: "And we will finish at Hodorov".

See also
List of Israel Prize recipients

References

1927 births
2006 deaths
Israeli footballers
Hapoel Rishon LeZion F.C. players
Hapoel Tel Aviv F.C. players
Hapoel Ramat Gan F.C. players
Shimshon Tel Aviv F.C. players
Israel international footballers
Israel Prize in sport recipients
Footballers from Rishon LeZion
Footballers at the 1958 Asian Games
1956 AFC Asian Cup players
1960 AFC Asian Cup players
Israeli people of Russian-Jewish descent
Association football goalkeepers
Asian Games competitors for Israel
Israeli Football Hall of Fame inductees
Israeli Footballer of the Year recipients